Guangzhou Huangpu Tram Line 1 is a tram line serving the Huangpu District of Guangzhou. The initial section opened on 1 July 2020. The remaining section opened on 28 December 2020.

Stations

See also
Guangzhou Tram

References

Transport in Guangzhou
Tram transport in China
Railway lines opened in 2020
2020 establishments in China